Tai Dam (or Black Tai) can refer to:

Tai Dam language
Tai Dam people